Faceache was a comic strip appearing in British comics in the 1970s and 1980s. He was created by Ken Reid.

Publication history 
Faceache first appeared in issue #1 of Jet, dated 1 May 1971. The strip was retained when Jet merged with Buster later that year, the first merged issue dated 2 October 1971. Reid continued drawing Faceache until his death in early 1987. Dez Skinn and Frank McDiarmid took over from then on, until the strip ended in the issue dated 1 October 1988.

Proposed collected edition
Rebellion Developments is due to republish the Faceache series as part of The Treasury of British Comics.

Fictional character biography 
Ricky Rubberneck was a boy with a "bendable bonce" (head), his skin like stretch rubber. At will, he could  his face into anything. The term "faceache" was commonly used in England from the 1950s onwards to mean "miserable-looking person".

Several of the stories were set at Belmonte School, home to two other recurring characters — his friend Cyril, and the headmaster Mr. Snipe.

As the years went by, the name Ricky Rubberneck was dropped, and the character was simply called "Faceache". Also, his  got more and more complex, with him able to appear identical to other people, and even  his entire body into various (monstrous) shapes, rather than just his face. In one strip he turned himself into a dodo, tricking his teacher into believing that that bird was not extinct; in another, he became a grotesque mole-like creature, burrowing under a smoke chimney and causing it to collapse.

Later appearance
An adult Faceache appears in the 2005–2006 comic book limited series Albion, as one of a number of comics characters who have been imprisoned by the British government. In Albion Faceache's real name is said to be "Frederick Akeley".

References

See also
British humour

British comic strips
Comics characters introduced in 1971
1971 comics debuts
1988 comics endings
British comics characters
Child characters in comics
Shapeshifter characters in comics